Kolamba Sanniya (Colombo Mania) is a 1976 Sinhalese language comedy film directed by Manik Sandrasagara that follows the lives of middle and upper-class people in rural and urban Sri Lanka. The film stars Geetha Kumarasinghe, Joe Abeywickrema and Denewake Hamine.

Synopsis
Andare, (Joe Abeywickrema) a rustic villager finds a valuable gem when he goes behind a bush to perform his morning ablutions. (no toilets in the village) He sells the gem and buys a house in Colombo. The whole family, Andare's elder sister (Denawaka Hamine), brother Jakolis (Eddie Jayamanne), son (Freddie Silva) and daughter (Geetha Kumarasinghe) try their best to get adjusted to the life of Colombo 7 - Cinnamon Gardens and as they find eventually, it is not an easy task.

Cast
 Joe Abeywickrama as Uspiala Gedera Andiris 'Andare' Appuhamy
 Eddie Jayamanne as Jacolis
 Denawaka Hamine as Andare's elder sister
 Geetha Kumarasinghe as Susila
 Freddie Silva as Tarzan
 Daya Alwis as Saralis 'Cyril Costa'
 Kirthi Sri Karunaratne as Hickman Nilrvastera
 Don Sirisena as Saping
 Shanthi Lekha as Andare's younger sister
 Lucky Wickramanayake as Bathroom investment seeker
 Jayalath Fernando as Party nationalist politician
 Pujitha Mendis as Massage Parlor receptionist

Music
The music in the film was composed by Sunil Santha and Clarence Wijewardena. The song Dum dama dama yana, Dum bara bage... was written by Father Marceline Jayakody and the music by maestro Sunil Santha. Music was also consulted by Sunil Mendis.

Remake
The remake of the film was released on 21 September 2018 with the title Kolomba Sanniya Returns, starring Sarath Kothalawala, Rajitha Hiran and Menaka Madhuwanthi.

References

External links

National Film Corporation of Sri Lanka - Official Website
Sri Lanka Cinema Database

1976 films
1970s Sinhala-language films